Lesotho first participated at the Olympic Games in 1972 and has sent athletes to compete in every Summer Olympic Games since then, except when they boycotted the 1976 Summer Olympics along with most other African nations.  Lesotho has never participated in the Winter Olympic Games.

To date, no athlete from Lesotho has ever won an Olympic medal.

The National Olympic Committee for Lesotho was created in 1971 and recognized by the International Olympic Committee in 1972.

Medal tables

Medals by Summer Games

Flag bearers 
This is a list of flag bearers who have represented Lesotho at the Olympics.

See also
 :Category:Olympic competitors for Lesotho
 Lesotho at the Paralympics

External links

References 

 
Olympics